Hells Kitchen Railway Museum & Bar is a private railway museum with a bar in the Main Street of Castlerea, County Roscommon in Ireland.

History 
This small privately run museum displays a unique collection of the passionate railway fan Sean Browne, who began in the 1950s to collate railway memorabilia: Nearly everything from signals, lamps, bells and tokens over warning plaques, posters and time tables to station boards. The center piece of the museum was the acquisition in 1994 of a Metropolitan-Vickers A Class locomotive, introduced in 1955 by Córas Iompair Éireann as part of the dieselisation programme that helped eliminate steam on Irish railways by April 1963. He purchased CIE 001 Class diesel locomotive no. 055, (earlier called A55) withdrawn as a result of the introduction of Iarnród Éireann 201 Class locomotives. To bring this into the bar wasn't an easy task and required some major re-construction of the building, because it is 51 ft (15.50 m) long and 14 ft (4.25 m) high and weighs 61 t. Thus it takes quite a bit of space in the bar and became a quirky curiosity not only for rail buffs.

The locomotive cost £100,000, which would be €2.5 million these days, but Sean Browne got it, being the only bidder, for the scrap value of £1,600 from CIÉ. The locomotive went on 7 July 1998 on its last trip from Dublin to Castlerea, before it was installed in the bar.

One of the historically most valuable exhibits is the staff of the railway line from Ballaghaderreen to Kilfree Junction, the last piece of track on which steam locomotive were still be used, until it was closed in 1963.

On 10 January 1992, Seán Doherty, TD gave a historically important television interview in this pub, which lead to the resignation of Taoiseach Charles Haughey.

References

External links 

 www.hellskitchenmuseum.com

Museums in County Roscommon